The Alfa Romeo Alfa 6 (Type 119) is a luxury executive car produced by the Italian automaker Alfa Romeo from 1979 to 1986. Its name refers to the six cylinders of the Alfa Romeo V6 engine, which made its first appearance on this car.

History
On its launch in 1979, the Alfa 6 was the flagship of the Alfa Romeo range. The four-door body was fairly conventional and used a similar style to the existing Alfa Romeo Alfetta, and in fact both vehicles share a great number of parts, including door panels; Design work on the 6 was done prior to the Alfa Romeo Alfetta, but the fuel crisis of 1973 delayed further development and led to the 6's belated 1979 debut. The styling was not particularly aerodynamic but the drag coefficient was a somewhat respectable 0.41. Power came from an all-new 2.5 V6 engine which generated  at 5600 rpm using a total of six carburettors and a single, belt driven camshaft in each cylinder head. Power steering, power windows, central locking, electric wing mirrors and a 25% limited slip differential were standard, making the Alfa 6 competitively priced compared to similar saloons of that time where such equipment typically was a costly extra.  The car was also designed to set new standards in safety; for example it featured a shock sensor in the boot which would cut off the fuel supply in the event of a crash.

Facelift
In 1983, the car was revamped, with single rectangle headlights replacing the twin round units, new bumpers, a new grille and new trim around the rear lights. This revamp also saw the introduction of two new engines, a 2.0 version of the existing V6 engine (which retained the carburettors and was specific for the Italian market, where engines larger than two liters were heavily taxed) and a 2.5 litre VM 5 cylinder turbodiesel.

The Bertone Delfino concept car in 1983 was based on Alfa 6.

Specifications
The engine and gearbox were situated at the front and a limited slip differential at the rear. The 6 was fitted with four disc brakes, with the rear ones inboard, to reduce unsprung weight. The 6 has De Dion tube at the rear and it has independent front corners, the gearbox was also located in the front. Two different 5-speed gearboxes were available: one with a "normal" layout, the other with "dog-leg" layout. A three speed automatic transmission from ZF was also available as an option and the ZF hydraulic power steering was the first to be fitted to an Alfa Romeo.

Engines and production

References

External links

Alfa Sei website
Alfa 6 Italian website
French website

Alfa 6
Full-size vehicles
Flagship vehicles
Sedans
Rear-wheel-drive vehicles
1980s cars
Cars introduced in 1979
Cars discontinued in 1986